This is a list of earthquakes in Italy that had epicentres in Italy, or significantly affected the country. The highest seismicity hazard in Italy was concentrated in the central-southern part of the peninsula, along the Apennine ridge, in Calabria and Sicily and in some northern areas, like Friuli, part of Veneto and western Liguria.

Geology
Italy lies on the southern extent of the Eurasian Plate, which is surrounded by the Aegean Sea Plate, the Adriatic Plate, and the Anatolian Plate. The Apennine Mountains contain numerous faults that run along the entire Italian peninsula and form the majority of the destructive boundary between the Eurasian and the Adriatic plates, thus causing Italy to have high amounts of tectonic activity. In addition, Sicily and Calabria are located near the boundary where the African plate is subducting below the Eurasian plate, which was responsible for forming the stratovolcano known as Mount Etna.

List of earthquakes

See also
Geology of Italy
Earthquakes in Albania
Earthquakes in Croatia
Earthquakes in Greece

References

Notes

Further reading
  (includes chronology)

External links 
 Catalogue of the Strong Earthquakes 461 a.C. – 1997 (from the National Institute of Geophysics and Vulcanology, Istituto Nazionale di Geofisica e Vulcanologia – INGV)

Italy
 
Earthquakes
Earthquakes
Tsunamis in Italy